The Human Stain is a 2003 drama film directed by Robert Benton. Its screenplay, by Nicholas Meyer, is based on the novel of the same name by Philip Roth. The film stars Anthony Hopkins, Nicole Kidman, Gary Sinise, and Ed Harris.

Plot
In the late 1990s, writer Nathan Zuckerman (Gary Sinise) has settled in a lakeside New England cabin following his second divorce and a battle with prostate cancer. His quiet life is interrupted by Coleman Silk (Anthony Hopkins), a former dean and professor of classics at local Athena College, who was forced to resign after being accused of making a racist remark in class. Coleman's wife died suddenly following the scandal, and he wants to avenge his loss of career and companion by writing a book about the events with Nathan's assistance.

The project is placed on the back burner when Coleman has an affair with Faunia Farley (Nicole Kidman), a considerably younger, semi-literate woman who supports herself by working menial jobs, including at the college. Their relationship is threatened by the faculty members who forced Coleman from his job and by Faunia's ex-husband Lester (Ed Harris), a mentally unbalanced Vietnam War veteran who blames her for the deaths of their children in an accident. Flashbacks of Coleman's life reveal to the audience his secret: he is an African-American who has "passed" as a white Jewish man for most of his adult life.

Cast
 Anthony Hopkins as Coleman Silk
 Wentworth Miller as young Coleman Silk
 Nicole Kidman as Faunia Farley
 Gary Sinise as Nathan Zuckerman
 Ed Harris as Lester Farley
 Jacinda Barrett as Steena Paulsson
 Mimi Kuzyk as Delphine Roux
 Clark Gregg as Nelson Primus
 Anna Deavere Smith as Dorothy Silk
 Phyllis Newman as Iris Silk
 Mili Avital as young Iris Silk
 Harry Lennix as Clarence Silk
 Tom Rack as Bob Cat
 Lizan Mitchell as Ernestine Silk
 Danny Blanco-Hall as Walter Silk
 Kerry Washington as Ellie
 Margo Martindale as Psychologist

Release
The film debuted at the Venice Film Festival. It was shown at the Toronto International Film Festival, the Bergen International Film Festival, and the Hollywood Film Festival before its theatrical release in the US.

Box office
The film grossed $5,381,908 in the US and $19,481,896 in foreign markets for a total worldwide box office of $24,863,304 against a budget of $30 million.

Critical response
The Human Stain received mixed reviews. Review aggregator Rotten Tomatoes reports that 42% of 155 professional critics gave the film a positive review, with a rating average of 5.48/10. The site's consensus reads, "Though the acting is fine, the leads are miscast, and the story is less powerful on screen than on the page."

In his review in The New York Times, A.O. Scott called it "an honorable B+ term paper of a movie: sober, scrupulous and earnestly respectful of its literary source ... The filmmakers explicate Mr. Roth's themes with admirable clarity and care and observe his characters with delicate fondness, but they cannot hope to approximate the brilliance and rapacity of his voice, which holds all the novel's disparate elements together. Without the active intervention of Mr. Roth's intelligence ... the story fails to cohere ... At its best – which also tends to be at its quietest – The Human Stain allows you both to care about its characters and to think about the larger issues that their lives represent. Its deepest flaw is an inability to link those moments of empathy and insight into a continuous drama, to suggest that the characters' lives keep going when they are not on screen."

Roger Ebert of the Chicago Sun-Times observed, "We have to suspend disbelief over the casting, but that's easier since we can believe the stories of these people. Not many movies probe into matters of identity or adaptation. Most movie characters are like Greek gods and comic book heroes: We learn their roles and powers at the beginning of the story, and they never change. Here are complex, troubled, flawed people, brave enough to breathe deeply and take one more risk with their lives."

In the San Francisco Chronicle, Mick LaSalle called it "a mediocre movie ... [that] falls victim to a fatal lack of narrative drive, suspense and drama. Kidman and Hopkins are wrong for their roles, and that, combined with a pervading inevitability, cuts the film off from any sustained vitality. The result is something admirable but lifeless."

David Stratton of Variety described it as "an intelligent adaptation of Philip Roth's arguably unfilmable novel powered by two eye-catching performances ... A key problem Benton is unable to avoid is that Hopkins and Miller don't look (or talk) the least bit like one another. Miller, who gives a strong, muted performance, convinces as a light-skinned African-American in a way Hopkins never does, which is not to suggest that the Welsh-born actor doesn't give another intelligent, powerful portrayal. It's just that the believability gap looms large."

In Rolling Stone, Peter Travers said, "Hopkins and Kidman ... are both as mesmerizing as they are miscast ... The Human Stain is heavy going. It's the flashes of dramatic lightning that make it a trip worth taking."

The Times of London called it "sapping and unbelievable melodrama ... an unforgivably turgid lecture about political correctness."

Awards and nominations

 American Film Institute Award for Best Movies of 2003 (winner)
 Washington D.C. Area Film Critics Association Award for Best Supporting Actress (Anna Deavere Smith, winner)
 Black Reel Award for Best Supporting Actress in a Motion Picture (Smith, winner)
 Black Reel Award for Best Actor in a Motion Picture (Wentworth Miller, nominee)
 Black Reel Award for Best Breakthrough Performance (Miller, nominee)

Music

The soundtrack to The Human Stain was released September 23, 2003.

See also
 Whitewashing in film

References

External links
 
 
 
 Movie stills

2003 films
2003 thriller drama films
American thriller drama films
German thriller drama films
2000s English-language films
English-language French films
English-language German films
Films directed by Robert Benton
Films with screenplays by Nicholas Meyer
Films based on American novels
Films shot in Montreal
Films about race and ethnicity
Miramax films
Lakeshore Entertainment films
Films produced by Tom Rosenberg
Films produced by Gary Lucchesi
Films based on works by Philip Roth
Films scored by Rachel Portman
2003 drama films
2000s American films
2000s German films